International Day to End Violence Against Sex Workers is observed annually on December 17 by sex workers, their advocates, friends, families and allies. Originally conceived as a memorial and vigil for the victims of the Green River Killer in Seattle, Washington, US, it has evolved into an annual international event. The day calls attention to hate crimes committed against sex workers worldwide, as well as the need to remove the social stigma and discrimination that have contributed to violence against sex workers and indifference from the communities they are part of. Sex worker activists also state that custom and prohibitionist laws perpetuate such violence.

Background
First observed in 2003, the International Day to End Violence Against Sex Workers was founded by Dr. Annie Sprinkle and Robyn Few, founder of the Sex Workers Outreach Project USA (SWOP-USA), an American sex worker rights organization. In a public letter, Sprinkle states:

Violent crimes against sex workers go underreported, unaddressed and unpunished. There really are people who don't care when prostitutes are victims of hate crimes, beaten, raped, and murdered. No matter what you think about sex workers and the politics surrounding them, sex workers are a part of our neighborhoods, communities and families.

Red umbrella symbol
The red umbrella is an important symbol for sex worker rights and is used for events that are held on December 17. The red umbrella symbol was first used by sex workers in Venice, Italy, in 2001. Slovenian artist Tadej Pogacar collaborated with sex workers to create the "Prostitute Pavilion" and CODE: RED art installation for the 49th Venice Biennale of Art. Sex workers also held a street demonstration, the Red Umbrellas March, to protest inhumane work conditions and human rights abuses.

The International Committee on the Rights of Sex Workers in Europe (ICRSE) adopted the red umbrella as a symbol of resistance to discrimination in 2005. A corresponding march was organised as the closing event to the European Conference on Sex Work, Human Rights, Labour and Migration conference, held in Brussels, Belgium, at which almost 200 participants appeared.

See also

$pread
A Vindication of the Rights of Whores
Audacia Ray
COYOTE
Decriminalizing sex work
International Whores' Day
Margo St. James
Neal Falls
Sex workers' rights
Sex-positive feminism
Sexual and reproductive health and rights
World Charter for Prostitutes' Rights

References

External links
Official website of Network of Sex Work Projects (International)
Official website of Sex Workers Outreach Project USA (SWOP-USA)
December 17 Events – SWOP webpage
Sex Trafficking in Alaska –  website run by sex workers, sex trafficking victims, and their allies
SWANK Sex Worker Action New York - a radical sex worker initiative
$pread magazine - an independent publication by and for sex workers and their allies in the sex industry.
"Remembering Our Dead and Wounded" by Dr. Annie Sprinkle, Ph.D.

Sex workers' rights
Civil awareness days
December observances
Crimes against sex workers
Recurring events established in 2003